Omar Evans (born September 1, 1976, in Silver Spring, Maryland) is a former Canadian Football League defensive back who has played for the Montreal Alouettes, Saskatchewan Roughriders, Calgary Stampeders, and Winnipeg Blue Bombers.

Achievements
Evans was among the CFL's top defensive players in 2005. He had 5 interceptions which led the Blue Bombers and returned two of those picks for touchdowns.

College years
Evans attended Howard University and was a letterman in football. As a senior, he was won All-MEAC first team honors and was selected as Howard's Defensive Player of the Year, and finished his senior season with 25 tackles, and a team-leading five interceptions.

External links
Profile at cfl.ca

1976 births
Living people
Saskatchewan Roughriders players
Montreal Alouettes players
Calgary Stampeders players
Winnipeg Blue Bombers players
Canadian football defensive backs
Howard University alumni
Evan, Omar
People from Silver Spring, Maryland